Camp Slaughter (also known as Camp Daze) is a 2005 slasher film written and directed by Alex Pucci, and co-written by Draven Gonzales.

Plot 

During a sing-along at Camp Hiawatha in 1981, two revelers sneak away to have sex, and are killed by an unseen assailant. Twenty-four years later, four friends (Angela, Jen, Mario, and Vade) are driving through the area on their way to Boston. The quartet becomes lost (passing the same sign several times) and their SUV breaks down after night comes unusually early. All the electronics fail to work, and the group is thrown into hysterics when screams emanate from the surrounding forest, and the vehicle is pelted with debris, prompting them to spend the night in it.

In the morning, the travelers are found by campers and counselors from Hiawatha, and invited to stay at the camp, which looks like it has not changed since the 1980s. As the quartet is shown around (noticing how anachronistic the place is) someone murders any campers who go off on their own or in a pair. That night, the killer rampages through the facilities, butchering everyone except the quartet. At dawn, the travelers awaken to discover that nothing appears to be wrong, and that everyone is alive again.

Daniel and Ivan, a pair of counselors who are aware of what is going on, find the four, and explain that the camp is in a time loop, stuck repeating the day of the killing spree. To prove they are telling the truth, the counselors take the others to witness the first murder, a strangulation in the woods, which they have never been able to stop, despite their best efforts. The time-displaced four try to leave on their own, but the SUV will not appear until nightfall, and walking away just brings them back to Hiawatha. Daniel and Ivan state that they are limited in what they can do, but with the help of outsiders, they may be able to break the loop, and move on to whatever fate awaits them.

The night of the massacre, it is revealed that Daniel and Ivan are the murderers, and that they manipulated Michelle and Ruben, a pair of outcasts, into helping them with their thrill killing. The psychopaths intend to have the travelers take their place in the cycle, which they believe they can achieve by murdering them, so they can get out. Mario and Vade die, but Angela and Jen manage to kill Daniel and Ivan. The girls go to the SUV, where Lou, the groundskeeper, is attacking Michelle and Ruben. Lou snaps Michelle's neck, and exposits that he took out the perpetrators of the original massacre minutes after it occurred. A wounded Ruben then shoots an arrow into Angela's chest, and is stomped to death by Lou as Jen escapes in the SUV.

Three years later, Jen has become a successful writer, and while in her office one day, she receives an email. It is from Daniel and Ivan, who have written that they cannot wait to meet their "favorite author" soon.

Cast 

 Kyle Lupo as Daniel
 Anika McFall as Jen
 Joanna Suhl as Angela
 Jon Fleming as Ivan
 Eric McIntire as Vade
 Matt Dallas as Mario
 Bethany Taylor as Michelle
 Miles Davis as Ruben
 Ashley Gomes as Nicole
 Philip Jess as Jay
 Ikaika Kahoano as Patrick
 Jessica Sonneborn as Elizabeth
 Troy Andersen as Tommy
 Brendan Bradley as Paul Marq
 Kyle Langan as Wesley
 Jesse Gurtis as Mark
 Amanda Gallagher as Linda
 Jim Marlowe as Lou

Reception 

A 2/5 was awarded by Jay Seaver of eFilmCritic, who referred to Camp Slaughter as an "illogical" and "deeply stupid movie" that "winds up being for gorehounds only".

See also 
 List of films featuring time loops

References

External links 
 
 

2000s science fiction horror films
2000s teen horror films
2005 horror films
2005 science fiction films
2005 films
American independent films
American science fiction horror films
American teen horror films
Films set in 1981
Films set in 2005
Films set in 2008
Films set in Maine
Films shot in Maine
American slasher films
Films about summer camps
American supernatural horror films
Time loop films
Films about time travel
2000s English-language films
2000s American films